The following article presents a summary of the 1981 football (soccer) season in Brazil, which was the 80th season of competitive football in the country.

Campeonato Brasileiro Série A

Quarterfinals

|}

Semifinals

|}

Final

Grêmio declared as the Campeonato Brasileiro champions by aggregate score of 3-1.

Campeonato Brasileiro Série B

Semifinals

|}

Final

Guarani declared as the Campeonato Brasileiro Série B champions by aggregate score of 5-3.

Promotion
The first placed team in each one of the four groups in the second stage, which were Bahia, Náutico, Palmeiras and Uberaba, were promoted to the same season's first level's second stage.

Campeonato Brasileiro Série C

Semifinal Group A

Semifinal Group B

Final

Olaria declared as the Campeonato Brasileiro Série C champions by aggregate score of 4-1.

State championship champions

Youth competition champions

Other competition champions

Brazilian clubs in international competitions

Brazil national team
The following table lists all the games played by the Brazil national football team in official competitions and friendly matches during 1981.

References

 Brazilian competitions at RSSSF
 1981 Brazil national team matches at RSSSF

 
Seasons in Brazilian football
Brazil